The Amateur Softball Association of the Philippines is the national governing body for softball in the Philippines. It  is accredited by the International Softball Federation which is the governing body for the sport of softball in the world. It currently manages the men's and women's national teams for softball, the Blu Boys and Blu Girls.

External links
Official Website
Amateur Softball Association of the Philippines profile at the Philippine Olympic Committee website

References

Philippines
Softball in the Philippines
Softball